Glen(n) Smith may refer to:

Glen Smith (basketball) (1928–2019), American basketball player
Glen Smith (cricketer) (born 1973), Bermudian cricketer
Glen Smith (discus thrower) (born 1972), English discus thrower
Glen Smith (ice hockey) (born 1931), Canadian ice hockey player
Glen Smith (racing driver), American racing driver in 1984 24 Hours of Le Mans
Glenn Smith (1895–1949), ice hockey player
Glenn W. Smith (born 1953), author, activist and political consultant
Glen R. Smith, U.S. farmer and businessman

See also
Dee Glen Smith Spectrum, a multi-purpose arena on the campus of Utah State University